Ménaîc Raoul is a Canadian film producer, currently associated with Sailor Productions. She is most noted as producer, alongside Gabrielle Tougas-Fréchette, of the films The Twentieth Century, which was a Canadian Screen Award nominee for Best Motion Picture at the 8th Canadian Screen Awards in 2020, and Without Havana (Sin la Habana), which was a Prix Iris nominee for Best Film at the 24th Quebec Cinema Awards in 2022.

Her other credits have included the films Wintergreen (Paparmane), With Jeff (Avec Jeff, à moto), Blue Thunder (Bleu tonnerre), The Heart of Madame Sabali (Le Cœur de Madame Sabali), All You Can Eat Buddha and Nouveau Québec.

References

External links

Canadian women film producers
Film producers from Quebec
Living people